Mount Noxon is a peak of the Walker Mountains, rising at the head of Myers Glacier on Thurston Island. It was delineated from air photos taken by U.S. Navy Operation Highjump in December 1946. It was named by the Advisory Committee on Antarctic Names (US-ACAN) for Sergeant W.C. Noxon of the United States Marine Corps (USMC) who served as navigator on aerial photographic flights over this area by U.S. Navy Squadron VX-6 in January 1960.

See also
 Mountains in Antarctica

Maps
 Thurston Island – Jones Mountains. 1:500000 Antarctica Sketch Map. US Geological Survey, 1967.
 Antarctic Digital Database (ADD). Scale 1:250000 topographic map of Antarctica. Scientific Committee on Antarctic Research (SCAR). Since 1993, regularly upgraded and updated.

References

Mountains of Ellsworth Land